Statistics for the 1979–80 season of the Ekstraklasa (the top tier of association football in Poland).

Overview
It was contested by 16 teams, and Szombierki Bytom won the championship.

League table

Results

Top goalscorers

References

External links
 Poland – List of final tables at RSSSF 

Ekstraklasa seasons
1979–80 in Polish football
Pol